Optical radiation is part of the electromagnetic spectrum. It is subdivided into ultraviolet radiation (UV), the spectrum of light visible for man (VIS) and infrared radiation (IR). It ranges between wavelengths of 100 nm to 1 mm.  Electromagnetic waves in this range obey the laws of optics – they can be focused and refracted with lenses, for example.

Effects
Optical radiation may be produced  by artificial sources, such as UV lights, common light bulbs, and radiant heaters, but the primary source of exposure for most people is the sun.  This exposure can result in negative health effects. All wavelengths across this range of the spectrum, from UV to IR, can produce thermal injury to the surface layers of the skin, including the eye.  When it comes from natural sources, this sort of thermal injury might be called a sunburn.  However, thermal injury from infrared radiation could also occur in a workplace, such as a foundry, where such radiation is generated by industrial processes.  At the other end of this range, UV light has enough photon energy that it can cause direct effects to protein structure in tissues, and is well established as carcinogenic in humans.  Occupational exposures to UV light occur in welding and brazing operations, for example.

Excessive exposure to natural or artificial UV-radiation means immediate (acute) and long-term (chronic) damage to the eye and skin. Occupational exposure limits may be one of two types:  rate limited or dose limited.  Rate limits characterize the exposure based on effective energy (radiance or irradiance, depending on the type of radiation and the health effect of concern) per area per time, and dose limits characterize the exposure as a total acceptable dose.  The latter is applied when the intensity of the radiation is great enough to produce a thermal injury.

Specifications
The European Union (EU) has laid down minimum harmonized requirements for the protection of workers against the risks arising from exposure to Artificial Optical Radiation (e.g. UVA, laser, etc.) in the Directive 2006/25/EC. A Non-binding guide to good practice for implementing Directive 2006/25/EC "Artificial Optical Radiation" is available on this page.

References 

Electromagnetic spectrum
Electromagnetic radiation